Drees & Sommer is an international consulting company working in the building and real estate sector with head office in Germany. The key services provided by the company are development and process consulting, infrastructure consulting, project management and engineering as well as real estate consulting.  Drees & Sommer accompanies building construction and infrastructure projects.

According to the corporate philosophy “the blue way” the aspects of economic efficiency and sustainability are always seen in context. The core topics include green building, green development and portfolio optimisation, from consulting via project management up to certification and international green building labels. Another service focus is on professional processing of complex large-scale projects supported by innovative measures such as building information modelling and lean construction management.

The company has managed major projects such as Potsdamer Platz in Berlin and the Trade Fair Center Stuttgart and is currently managing the construction of the new headquarters building Bau 1 ('Building 1') for the pharmaceutical company F. Hoffmann-La Roche in Basel.

Company structure 
Drees & Sommer AG is a stock company managed by partners. All shares are held by active or former managers of the company who have made a special contribution to the success of the company. As a result, the company is independent of third parties. The individual regional offices are independent operational units under the Drees & Sommer AG holding company. The executive board comprises three active partners.

History 
In 1970 Gerhard Drees and Volker Kuhne founded an engineering firm specializing in critical path analysis, production planning, company organization, and construction consulting. Hans Sommer became a Partner in 1973. Over the years, the number of employees and regional offices grew steadily. In the early 1980s, the company adopted the Partner model to manage this continual growth. Each regional office is an independent self-managed subsidiary responsible for its employees.
Drees & Sommer Aktiengesellschaft (stock corporation) was founded in 1991. The individual companies are now organized under the umbrella of the holding company. Company founder Gerhard Drees was chair of the supervisory board, Hans Sommer chair of the management board (now executive board). Hans Sommer took over from Gerhard Drees as chair of the supervisory board at the beginning of 2008. The company is managed by the partners, who are also the stockholders of the company. Partners Dierk Mutschler, Peter Tzeschlock and Gabriele Walker-Rudolf were elected to the executive board. The company celebrated its 40th anniversary in 2010. In 2012, Joachim Drees became a member of the board.

See also

External links 
 Drees & Sommer AG website

Companies based in Stuttgart
Construction and civil engineering companies of Germany
Multinational companies headquartered in Germany
Construction and civil engineering companies established in 1970
German companies established in 1970